Anna Elisabeth "Anneliese" Michel (21 September 1952 – 1 July 1976) was a German woman who underwent 67 Catholic exorcism rites during the year before her death. She died of malnutrition, for which her parents and priest were convicted of negligent homicide. She was diagnosed with epileptic psychosis (temporal lobe epilepsy) and had a history of psychiatric treatment that proved ineffective.

When Michel was 16, she experienced a seizure and was diagnosed with psychosis caused by temporal lobe epilepsy. Shortly thereafter, she was diagnosed with depression and was treated by a psychiatric hospital. By the time she was 20, she had become intolerant of various religious objects and began to hear voices. Her condition worsened despite medication, and she became suicidal, also displaying other symptoms, for which she took medication as well. After the taking of psychiatric medications for five years failed to improve her symptoms, Michel and her family became convinced she was possessed by a demon. As a result, her family appealed to the Catholic Church for an exorcism. While rejected at first, two priests got permission from the local bishop in 1975. The priests began conducting exorcism sessions and the parents stopped consulting doctors. Anneliese Michel stopped eating food and died of malnourishment and dehydration after 67 exorcism sessions. Michel's parents and the two Roman Catholic priests were found guilty of negligent homicide and were sentenced to six months in jail (reduced to three years of probation), as well as a fine. In a conference several years later, German bishops retracted the claim that she was possessed.

Several films are based on her story, including the 2005 film The Exorcism of Emily Rose, the award-winning 2006 film Requiem and the 2011 film Anneliese: The Exorcist Tapes.

Early life
Born as Anna Elisabeth Michel on 21 September 1952 in Leiblfing, Bavaria, West Germany to a Roman Catholic family, Michel was raised along with three sisters by her parents, Joseph and Anna. She was religious and attended Mass twice a week. When she was 16, she experienced a severe convulsion and was diagnosed with temporal lobe epilepsy. In 1973, Michel attended the University of Würzburg. Her classmates later described her as "withdrawn and very religious".

Psychiatric treatment
In June 1970, Michel had a third seizure at the psychiatric hospital where she had been staying. She was prescribed anti-convulsion drugs for the first time, including Dilantin, which did not alleviate the problem. She described seeing "devil faces" at various times of the day. That same month, she was prescribed Aolept, which is similar to chlorpromazine and is used in the treatment of various psychoses including schizophrenia, disturbed behavior and delusions. By 1973, she began experiencing depression, hallucinated while praying and complained about hearing voices telling her that she was "damned" and would "rot in hell". Michel's treatment in a psychiatric hospital did not improve her health and her depression worsened. Long-term treatment also did not help, and she grew increasingly frustrated with her medical care after having taken pharmacological drugs for five years. Michel became intolerant of Christian sacred places and objects, such as the crucifix.

Michel visited San Damiano with a family friend who regularly organized Christian pilgrimages. Her escort concluded that she was suffering from demonic possession because she was unable to walk past a crucifix and refused to drink the water of a Christian holy spring.

Michel's family and community became convinced that she was possessed and consulted several priests to request an exorcism. The priests declined, recommended the continuation of medical treatment and informed the family that exorcisms required the bishop's permission. In the Catholic Church, official approval for an exorcism is granted when the subject strictly meets the set criteria and is considered to be suffering from possession and under demonic control. Intense dislike for religious objects and supernatural powers are some of the first indications.

Michel worsened physically and displayed aggression, injured herself, drank her own urine and ate insects. In November 1973, Michel began treatment with Tegretol, an anti-seizure drug and mood stabilizer. She was prescribed antipsychotic drugs during the course of the religious rites and consumed them frequently until some time before her death. Despite taking these neuroleptic medications, Michel's symptoms worsened and she began "growling, seeing demons, throwing things."

Exorcism

The priest Father Ernst Alt declared that Michel "didn't look like an epileptic" and that he did not observe her experiencing seizures. Alt believed that she was suffering from demonic possession and urged the local bishop to allow an exorcism. In a letter to Alt in 1975, Michel wrote, "I am nothing; everything about me is vanity. What should I do? I have to improve. You pray for me" and also once told him, "I want to suffer for other people ... but this is so cruel." In September 1975, Bishop Josef Stangl granted Father Arnold Renz permission to perform an exorcism according to the Rituale Romanum, but ordered total secrecy.

Renz performed the first session on 24 September. Michel began increasingly speaking about "dying to atone for the wayward youth of the day and the apostate priests of the modern church." Her parents stopped consulting doctors at her request and relied solely on the exorcism rites. A total of 67 exorcism sessions, one or two each week lasting up to four hours each, were performed over approximately ten months in 1975 and 1976. Toward the end of her life, Michel began to refuse food.

Death

On 1 July 1976, Michel died in her home. The autopsy report stated the cause of death as malnutrition and dehydration resulting from almost a year in a state of near starvation while the rites of exorcism were performed.

Prosecution
After an investigation, the state prosecutor maintained that Michel's death could have been prevented as late as one week before she died.

In 1976, the state charged Michel's parents and priests Ernst Alt and Arnold Renz with negligent homicide. The parents were defended by famed Nuremberg trials defense attorney Erich Schmidt-Leichner and the priests' defense counsel were paid by the church. The state recommended that none of the involved parties be jailed; instead, the recommended sentence for the priests was a fine, while the prosecution concluded that the parents should be exempt from punishment as they had "suffered enough," a mitigating legal factor in German penal law (cf. § 60 StGB).

Trial
The trial began on 30 March 1978 in the district court and drew intense interest. Doctors testified that Michel was not possessed, stating that the manifestations of demonic possession were a psychological effect of her strict religious upbringing as well as her epilepsy. Dr. Richard Roth, whom Alt had consulted for medical help, allegedly told Michel during the exorcism that "there is no injection against the devil, Anneliese." Schmidt-Leichner argued that the exorcism was legal and that the German constitution protected citizens in the unrestricted exercise of their religious beliefs. The defense played tapes recorded at the exorcism sessions, sometimes featuring what was claimed to be "demons arguing" to assert their claim that Michel was possessed. Both priests claimed that the demons identified themselves as Lucifer, Cain, Judas Iscariot, Belial, Legion, Hitler and Nero, among others. They also stated that Michel was finally freed of demonic possession resulting from the exorcism just before her death.

Bishop Stangl said that he was not aware of Michel's alarming health condition when he approved of the exorcism and did not testify in court. In April 1978, the Michels and the two priests were convicted of negligent homicide but were given suspended prison sentences, and they were ordered to share the costs of the legal proceedings. The sentences have been described as stiffer than those requested by the prosecutor, who had asked that the priests only be fined and that the parents be found guilty but not punished.  By approving the ancient exorcism rite, the church drew public and media attention. According to author John M. Duffey, the case was a misidentification of mental illness. In a conference several years later, German bishops retracted the claim that she was possessed.

Exhumation and aftermath

After the trial, the Michels asked the authorities for permission to exhume the remains of their daughter because she had been buried in undue hurry in a cheap coffin. Almost two years after the burial, on 25 February 1978, her remains were replaced in a new oak coffin lined with tin. The official reports state that the body bore signs consistent with deterioration of a corpse of that age. The family and the priests were discouraged from viewing Michel's remains. Father Renz later stated that he had been prevented from entering the mortuary. Michel's gravesite remains a pilgrimage site.

The number of officially sanctioned exorcisms decreased in Germany following the ordeal despite Pope Benedict XVI's support for wider use of the practice as compared to that of his predecessor Pope John Paul II, who in 1999 tightened the rules to permit only rare cases for exorcisms.

On 6 June 2013, a fire engulfed the house where Michel had lived. Although the local police determined that it was a case of arson, some locals attributed the fire to the exorcism case.

In popular culture
 Three films, The Exorcism of Emily Rose (which focuses on both the court case and the exorcism), Requiem and Anneliese: The Exorcist Tapes, are loosely based on Michel's story. 
 First Issue, the debut album by post-punk band Public Image Ltd, contains a song titled "Annalisa" that is based on the case.
 The case and the theories surrounding it were discussed during the fourth episode of the first season of the BuzzFeed web series BuzzFeed Unsolved: Supernatural in November 2016.
 The case and its history were covered in Case 11: Anneliese Michel, a March 2016 episode of the Casefile True Crime Podcast.
 The exorcism was covered in the podcast My Favorite Murder in Episode 66, "The Devil's Number."
 The Last Podcast on the Left covered Anneliese Michel's story in episodes 473 and 474.

See also

 Exorcism in Christianity

Notes

References

Further reading
 Goodman, Felicitas D. (1988). How about Demons?: Possession and Exorcism in the Modern World. Indianapolis: Indiana University Press. .
 
 Getler, Micheal. "Cries of a Woman Possessed : German Court Hears Tapes in Exorcism Death Trial" in The Washington Post (21 April 1978)

External links

 Casefile True Crime Podcast - Case 11: Anneliese Michel - 19 March 2016
 

1952 births
1976 deaths
1976 crimes in Germany
20th-century German people
20th-century German women
Exorcised people
German Roman Catholics
German victims of crime
Manslaughter victims
People from Straubing-Bogen
People with epilepsy
University of Würzburg alumni
Demonic possession
Deaths by dehydration
Deaths by starvation